Richard R. Slager (born March 1954) was an American football quarterback and tennis player for Upper Arlington High School in Columbus, Ohio, and for the University of Notre Dame. He was the chairman and CEO of VistaCare Hospice Services in Scottsdale, Arizona until March 2008.

After backing up quarterback Tom Clements for two years at Notre Dame, Slager was named the starter by new head coach Dan Devine. In an injury-plagued 1975 season, he completed 66 of 139 passes for 686 yards, often relieved by sophomore Joe Montana, en route to an 8-3 record. During his final season in 1976, Slager led the Irish to a 9-3 record and a top-20 ranking, completing 86 of 172 passes for 1,281 yards and 11 touchdowns. After graduation, Slager served as a graduate assistant coach for three years while attending Notre Dame Law School.

In 1988, Slager founded Karrington Health, Inc. in Bexley, Ohio.

References

1954 births
Living people
Players of American football from Columbus, Ohio
American football quarterbacks
Notre Dame Fighting Irish football players
Notre Dame Fighting Irish football coaches